In Greek mythology, Polydorus or Polydoros (means 'many-gift[ed]') was a king of Thebes.

Family 
Polydorus was the youngest and only male child of Cadmus and Harmonia, his sisters were Autonoë, Ino, Agave and Semele. He was the father of Labdacus by Nycteïs, the daughter of Nycteus.

Mythology 
Upon the death of Cadmus, Pentheus, the son of Echion and Agave, after banishing Polydorus ruled Thebes for a short time until Dionysus prompted Agave to kill Pentheus.  Polydorus then succeeded Pentheus as king of Thebes and married Nycteïs. When their son Labdacus was still young, Polydorus died of unknown causes, entrusting his father-in-law Nycteus to care the infant prince and to be his regent.

In Pausanias's history, Polydorus' rule began when his father abdicated the throne and together with his mother Harmonia migrated to the Illyrian tribe of the Enchelii, but this is the only source for such a timeline. It is also said that along with the thunderbolt hurled at the bridal chamber of Semele there fell a log from heaven. This log was adorned by Polydorus with bronze and called it Dionysus Cadmus.

A different account by Diodorus stated that the Thebans were exiled a second time (the first time during the reign of Cadmus) for Polydorus came back and was dissatisfied with the situation because of the misfortunes that had befallen Amphion, the previous king, in connection with his children.

Genealogy

Family tree of Theban Royal House

Notes

References 

 Apollodorus. The Library, with an English Translation by Sir James George Frazer, F.B.A., F.R.S. in 2 Volumes. Cambridge, MA, Harvard University Press; London, William Heinemann Ltd. 1921.
 Arrian. The Anabasis of Alexander, translated by Edward James Chinnock (d. 1920), from the Hodder and Stoughton edition of 1884.
 Diodorus Siculus. The Library of History translated by Charles Henry Oldfather (1887–1954), from the Loeb Classical Library edition of 1933.
 Euripides. The Phoenissae, translated by E. P. Coleridge. New York. Random House. 1938.
 Herodotus. The Histories with an English translation by A. D. Godley. Cambridge. Harvard University Press. 1920.
 Hesiod. The Homeric Hymns and Homerica with an English Translation by Hugh G. Evelyn-White. Theogony. Cambridge, MA.,Harvard University Press; London, William Heinemann Ltd. 1914.
 Hyginus. Fabulae from The Myths of Hyginus, translated and edited by Mary Grant. University of Kansas Publications in Humanistic Studies, no. 34.
 Pausanias. Description of Greece with an English Translation by W.H.S. Jones, Litt.D., and H.A. Ormerod, M.A., in 4 Volumes. Cambridge, MA, Harvard University Press; London, William Heinemann Ltd. 1918.
Sophocles. The Oedipus Tyrannus of Sophocles. Edited with introduction and notes by Sir Richard Jebb. Sir Richard Jebb. Cambridge. Cambridge University Press. 1887.
William Smith. A Dictionary of Greek and Roman biography and mythology vs Polydorus. London. John Murray: printed by Spottiswoode and Co., New-Street Square and Parliament Street. 1849.

Princes in Greek mythology
Theban kings
Kings in Greek mythology
Theban characters in Greek mythology
Theban mythology